Ryan Michael Pepiot (born August 21, 1997) is an American professional baseball pitcher for the Los Angeles Dodgers of Major League Baseball (MLB). He made his MLB debut in 2022.

Early life and amateur career
Pepiot was born in Indianapolis, Indiana, and grew up in Westfield, Indiana, where he attended Westfield High School and played baseball, basketball, and football. In football, he was named Class 5-A All-State at quarterback as a senior.

Pepiot attended Butler University and played college baseball for the Butler Bulldogs for three seasons. After his sophomore year in 2018, Pepiot played collegiate summer baseball for the Hyannis Harbor Hawks of the Cape Cod Baseball League. As a junior, he went 4–4 with a 3.92 ERA in 14 starts while striking out a school record 126 batters over 78 innings. Pepiot finished the season as Butler's career leader in strikeouts with 306.

Professional career
The Los Angeles Dodgers selected Pepiot in the third round of the 2019 MLB draft; he became the highest-drafted Butler player in program history. Pepiot signed with the Dodgers and was initially assigned to the Arizona League Dodgers before being promoted to the Class-A Great Lakes Loons of the Midwest League. He finished the season with 13 appearances (10 starts) between the two levels, recording no decisions with a 1.93 ERA and 31 strikeouts in 23.1 innings pitched. Pepiot was named to the Dodgers' 2021 Spring Training roster as a non-roster invitee. He began the 2021 season with the Double-A Tulsa Drillers, where he went 3–4 with a 2.87 ERA, 0.94 WHIP, and 81 strikeouts over  innings pitched before being promoted to the Triple-A Oklahoma City Dodgers. In his 11 games (nine starts) for Oklahoma City, he was 2–5 with a 7.13 ERA. 

Pepiot began 2022 with Oklahoma City, where he started the season 2–0 with a 2.05 ERA in six starts with 36 strikeouts before he was promoted to the major leagues on May 11 to make his debut as the starting pitcher against the Pittsburgh Pirates on May 11, 2022. He struck out the first batter he faced, Ben Gamel, for his first MLB strikeout and  pitched three scoreless innings with one hit, a hit batter and five walks while striking out three. On July 5, Pepiot picked up his first major league win against the Colorado Rockies. He pitched in nine games for the Dodgers, making seven starts, and finished with a 3–0 record and 3.47 ERA. He also made 19 appearances (17 starts) for Oklahoma City on the season and was 9–1 with a 2.56 ERA.

References

External links

Butler Bulldogs bio

1997 births
Living people
Baseball players from Indianapolis
Major League Baseball pitchers
Los Angeles Dodgers players
Butler Bulldogs baseball players
Hyannis Harbor Hawks players
Arizona League Dodgers players
Great Lakes Loons players
Tulsa Drillers players
Oklahoma City Dodgers players